Joseph Hancock (23 August 1856 – 8 February 1916) was an Australian politician who represented the South Australian House of Assembly seat of Newcastle from 1890 to 1893.

References

Members of the South Australian House of Assembly
1856 births
1916 deaths